Luciano Buonfiglio (born November 15, 1950) is an Italian sprint canoer who competed in the mid-1970s. He was eliminated in the repechages of the K-4 1000 m event at the 1976 Summer Olympics in Montreal, Quebec.

As of 2009, Buonfiglio is treasurer of the International Canoe Federation.

References
International Canoe Federation Board of Directors featuring Buonfiglio. - accessed 13 October 2009.
Sports-Reference.com profile

1950 births
Canoeists at the 1976 Summer Olympics
Italian male canoeists
Italian referees and umpires
Living people
Olympic canoeists of Italy